Army Men: Sarge's Heroes 2 is a third-person shooter video game developed and published by The 3DO Company for Nintendo 64, Game Boy Color, PlayStation and PlayStation 2. The game is a direct sequel to Army Men: Sarge's Heroes. Unlike the previous game which was more dark in tone, this game has more of a lighthearted storyline.

Overview 
Sarge's Heroes 2 starts where its predecessor left off. It is announced that the capture of Field Marshal Tannenberg will end the war. Since General Plastro has disappeared, it is suggested that he has become a victim of plastrification and been trapped in the real world.  The game introduces Bridgette Bleu, a spy for the Blue Nation.  She has developed a serum that reverses plastrification. The player's job as Sarge and sometimes Vikki is to destroy the serum, eliminate Tan soldiers, and capture Plastro and Tannenberg (and as Sarge sometimes have to rescue Vikki as she has a knack for getting into trouble).

The game goes between Sarge's 'realistic' world and real world, in which Sarge is the size of a typical plastic Army Man soldier. It features many interactive effects, such as breakable wine bottles, bustable soda cans and music that spikes in intensity when enemies attack.

The plot of the Game Boy Color port is completely different to the console ones, involving Sarge, Riff, Scorch and Vikki trying to stop a powerful Tan Nation resurgence against the Green Nation, led by the reappearance of General Plastro. The plot of this version is still a direct sequel to Army Men: Sarge's Heroes however.

Reception

Samuel Bass reviewed the PlayStation version of the game for Next Generation, rating it two stars out of five: "Better than the first one, but we'll be sticking with Air Attack 2 for our plastic battlefield fix".

David Chen reviewed the PlayStation 2 version of the game for Next Generation, rating it one star out of five, and stated that "not much better than the original PlayStation version, which isn't saying much".

The game received average reviews. GameRankings and Metacritic gave it a score of 56% and 48 out of 100 for the PlayStation version; 55.99% and 54 out of 100 for the PlayStation 2 version, indicating "mixed or average reviews"; 50% for the Game Boy Color version; and 48% and 46 out of 100 for the Nintendo 64 version.

Notes

References

External links 

2000 video games
Army Men
Game Boy Color games
Multiplayer and single-player video games
Nintendo 64 games
PlayStation (console) games
PlayStation 2 games
Third-person shooters
Video game sequels
Video games developed in the United States